Tetragnatha mandibulata is a species of long-jawed orb-weaver spider in the family Tetragnathidae. It was first described by Walckenaer in 1841. The species is widespread and occurs in western Africa, southern and eastern Asia, and Australia.

References

Tetragnathidae
Spiders described in 1841
Cosmopolitan spiders